Frank Allen (born Francis Renaud McNeice; 14 December 1943, in Hayes, Middlesex, England) is an English bass guitarist who was a long-time member of The Searchers.

Career
Frank Allen played bass guitar with Cliff Bennett and the Rebel Rousers and The Searchers (since 1964 when he replaced original bass guitarist Tony Jackson), and remained with  them until they played their final gig in 2019. Allen joined Cliff Bennett and the Rebel Rousers as rhythm guitarist in 1961, and changed over to bass guitar in early 1962, following the departure of Ben Jordan.

When Tony Jackson left the Searchers in August 1964 after a string of hits (including "Sweets for My Sweet", "Sugar and Spice" and "Needles and Pins"), Allen was asked to join the group. They then recorded "When You Walk in the Room",  with Mike Pender and Frank Allen singing a dual lead line.

Allen wrote a book of touring recollections called Travelling Man in 1999. His definitive and detailed biography of the Searchers entitled The Searchers And Me - A History of the Legendary Sixties Hitmakers was published in April 2009.

The Searchers retired the band in March 2019.

Further reading
Frank Allen: The Searchers and Me - A history of the Legendary Sixties Hitmakers 
 Frank Allen: Travelling Man - On the Road with The Searchers 
 The Rolling Stone Encyclopedia of Rock and Roll – Third Edition 
The 1000 UK Number One Hits

Discography

Cliff Bennett and the Rebel Rousers (Singles) 

 July 1961: "You've Got What I Like" / "I'm in Love With You" 
 October 1961: "That's What I Said" / "When I Get Paid" 
 March 1962: "Poor Joe" / "Hurtin' Inside" 
 July 1963: "Everybody Loves A Lover" / "My Old Stand By" 
 November 1963: "You Really Got A Hold on Me" / "Alright" 
 March 1964: "Got My Mojo Working" / "Beautiful Dreamer"

Cliff Bennett and the Rebel Rousers (EPs) 

 1964 'She said Yeah'/ 'Doctor Feelgood' / 'You Make Me Happy' / 'Stupidity'

The Searchers (Albums) 

 1965 – Sounds Like Searchers
 1965 – Take Me for What I'm Worth
 1972 – Second Take
 1979 – Searchers
 1981 – Play for Today
 1988 – Hungry Hearts

References

External links
 Searchers website
 The Searchers Records

1943 births
English autobiographers
English bass guitarists
English male guitarists
Male bass guitarists
People from Hayes, Hillingdon
Living people
Cliff Bennett and the Rebel Rousers members
The Searchers (band) members